Hypomnemata may refer to:

 Plural of the Greek term hypomnema, later used by Michel Foucault
 Several ancient literary works by writers including:
 Aeneas Tacticus
 Aristoxenus
 Hegesander (historian)
 Hegesippus (chronicler)
 Ion of Chios
 Strabo
 Symmachus (translator)
 The title of a commentary, as in many of the Commentaria in Aristotelem Graeca; including works by:
 Porphyry (philosopher)
 Several works by modern authors, including:
 Jan Bake
 Thomas Bartholin
 Heinrich von Cocceji
 Christian August Crusius
 John Prideaux
 Daniel Sennert
 Simon Stevin
 Andreas Werckmeister
 , a series of scholarly publications in classical studies

Greek words and phrases